Jungle Mystery is a 1932 American pre-Code  Universal 12-chapter movie serial directed by Ray Taylor.  The serial was based on a book called "The Ivory Trail" by Talbot Mundy. A 1935 feature version was also released, edited down to 75 minutes.

Plot
Various expeditionary parties head to Zanzibar to search for a legendary cache of ivory and a missing explorer named Jack Morgan.  Tom Tyler played the hero, Kirk Montgomery, and Cecilia Parker played the heroine, Barbara Morgan, who is searching for her missing brother Jack. Boris Shillov and his henchman Comrade Krotsky are also searching for the ivory. The "jungle mystery" pertains to a half-man, half-ape creature named Zungu.

Cast
 Tom Tyler as Kirk Montgomery
 Noah Beery Jr. as Fred Oakes
 Cecilia Parker as Barbara Morgan
 William Desmond as John Morgan (Barbara's father)
 Philo McCullough as Georgie Coutlass
 Carmelita Geraghty as Belle Waldron
 James A. Marcus as Boris Shillov
 Anders Van Haden as Comrade Krotsky (Shillov's chief henchman)
 Frank Lackteen as Kazimoto
 Peggy Watts as Azu (Barbara's servant)
 Sam Baker as Zungu (the title character; half-man, half-ape)
 Onslow Stevens as Jack Morgan (Barbara's missing brother; uncredited)
 Ralph Morgan as Recap Narrator (voice; uncredited)

Production
The film is noteworthy for its extensive use of stock footage of various jungle animals, many of them repeated frequently throughout the serial. (There's even a shot of tigers, which are not native to Africa.) Apart from one sequence filmed in Bronson Canyon, it was shot entirely on the Universal backlot and soundstages.

Although it had been believed lost for many years, the original nitrate negative was in fact still in the Universal vaults. It was preserved in 2016 (along with the edited 1935 feature version which ran only 75 minutes) and officially re-premiered at the Cinecon Classic Film Festival in Hollywood, CA during the 2016 Labor Day weekend.

Chapter titles
 Into the Dark Continent
 The Ivory Trail
 The Death Stream
 Poisoned Fangs
 The Mystery Cavern
 Daylight Doom
 The Jaws of Death
 Trapped by the Enemy
 The Jungle Terror
 Ambushed!
 The Lion's Fury
 Buried Treasure
Source:

References

External links

1932 films
1932 adventure films
1930s rediscovered films
American black-and-white films
1930s English-language films
Films based on American novels
Universal Pictures film serials
Films directed by Ray Taylor
Films set in Tanzania
American adventure films
Rediscovered American films
Films with screenplays by George H. Plympton
1930s American films